Liebe Dein Symptom wie Dich selbst! (German: Thou shalt love thy symptom as thyself; 1996) is a German documentary film about the Slovenian philosopher and psychoanalyst Slavoj Žižek.

See also
Žižek!
Marx Reloaded
The Reality of the Virtual
The Pervert's Guide to Cinema
The Pervert's Guide to Ideology
Examined Life
Jacques Lacan

1996 films
Documentary films about Slavoj Žižek
Documentary films about psychology
German documentary films
1996 documentary films
Films about philosophy
1990s German films